Lee Gwan-pyo (born 7 September 1994) is a South Korean footballer who plays as a midfielder for Daejeon Korail.

Career
He signed with Jeju United in January 2015.

References

External links 

1994 births
Living people
South Korean footballers
Association football midfielders
Jeju United FC players
Suwon FC players
Gyeongnam FC players
Daejeon Korail FC players
K League 2 players
Korea National League players
Chung-Ang University alumni